State Highway 194 (SH 194) is a  long state highway in southeastern Colorado. SH 194's western terminus is at SH 109 in La Junta, and the eastern terminus is at U.S. Route 50 (US 50) near Las Animas.

Route description
SH 194 begins at its western end at a junction with SH 109 in the city of La Junta. SH 194 travels eastward from there closely paralleling US 50 for its entire length before meeting that same route at a junction just north of Las Animas; this junction with US 50 marks the eastern end of SH 194.  Roughly four miles east of La Junta, SH 194 travels past Bent's Old Fort National Historic Site, a reconstructed 19th century trading post located on the south side of the road.

History
The route was established in 1939 and was entirely paved by 1957. The trumpet interchange at US 50 was constructed in 1972.

Major intersections

References

External links

194
Transportation in Otero County, Colorado
Transportation in Bent County, Colorado